Joshua Steel (born 14 January 1997) is a British professional basketball player who currently plays for Surrey Scorchers in the British Basketball League.

Early life 
Steel attended Barking Abbey School and represented the Barking Abbey Basketball Academy. In 2012, he played 12 games for National Basketball League Division One team the Essex Leopards aged 14. He also spent two seasons playing semi-professionally with the Kent Crusaders between 2013 and 2015.

College career 
In 2015, Steel moved to the United States to join Duquesne University. He averaged 2.2 points, 0.7 assists, 0.8 rebounds and 0.2 steals per game in his freshman year, and averaged 9.5 points, 0.5 assists, 2.0 rebounds and 0.5 steals in his sophomore year.

Professional career 
In September 2017, Steel joined British Basketball League team the Surrey Scorchers.

International career 
Steel has represented England at U16 and U18 level, as well as Great Britain at U20 level. Josh successfully made the transition to the senior GB team and played at the EuroBasket Pre-Qualifiers.

References 

1997 births
Living people
British men's basketball players
Undrafted National Basketball Association players
British Basketball League players
Surrey Scorchers players
Força Lleida CE players
Guards (basketball)
Duquesne University alumni
Duquesne Dukes men's basketball players
Essex Leopards players